The 157th New York State Legislature, consisting of the New York State Senate and the New York State Assembly, met from January 3 to August 18, 1934, during the second year of Herbert H. Lehman's governorship, in Albany.

Background
Under the provisions of the New York Constitution of 1894, re-apportioned in 1917, 51 Senators and 150 assemblymen were elected in single-seat districts; senators for a two-year term, assemblymen for a one-year term. The senatorial districts consisted either of one or more entire counties; or a contiguous area within a single county. The counties which were divided into more than one senatorial district were New York (nine districts), Kings (eight), Bronx (three), Erie (three), Monroe (two), Queens (two) and Westchester (two). The Assembly districts were made up of contiguous area, all within the same county.

At this time there were two major political parties: the Democratic Party and the Republican Party. The Socialist Party and the Communist Party also nominated tickets. The Prohibition Party adopted at this time the name Law Preservation Party: to emphasize that Prohibition should be preserved while it was in the process of being repealed. They endorsed the "dry" candidates (mostly Republicans) and nominated own candidates in many districts where "wet" candidates were the front-runners. In New York City, a "City Fusion" (generally allied with the Republicans) and a "Recovery" (Anti-Tammany Democrats supporting Joseph V. McKee) ticket were nominated for the local elections held at the same time.

Elections
The New York state election, 1933, was held on November 7. The only statewide elective office up for election was a judgeship on the New York Court of Appeals which was carried by the incumbent Democrat Leonard C. Crouch who was nominated by the Democrats and endorsed by the Republicans, the Law Preservation Party and the City Fusion.

The approximate party strength at this election, as expressed by the vote for Judge of the Court of Appeals, was: Democrats/Republicans/Law Preservation/City Fusion 3,250,000; Socialists 100,000; and Communists 31,000.

Doris I. Byrne (Dem.), a lawyer from the Bronx, was the only woman elected to the 157th Legislature.

Sessions
The Legislature met for the regular session at the State Capitol in Albany on January 3, 1934; and adjourned at 2.30 a.m. on April 28.

Joseph A. McGinnies (Rep.) was re-elected Speaker.

Marguerite O'Connell (Dem.) was elected Clerk of the New York State Senate to fill the unexpired term of her deceased husband Patrick H. O'Connell, becoming the first woman to hold this office.

Assembly Clerk Fred W. Hammond (Rep.) encountered opposition from the Republican State Committee Chairman W. Kingsland Macy who instructed his followers not to vote for Hammond. The second ballot for assembly clerk, on January 4, stood: Hammond 66; Louis A. Cuvillier (Dem.) 62; Charles F. Close (Rep.) 16; Ward H. Arburry 3; and Clement Curry 1. The split persisted, and no clerk could be elected. On January 12, in an unprecedented move, Speaker McGinnies appointed Hammond as Clerk without election.

State Senator Warren T. Thayer (Rep.) was accused to act as a lobbyist for a utility company while having been chairman of the senate committee in charge of the pertaining legislation. He resigned his seat on June 11. He was tried before the Senate Committee on the Judiciary and on June 19, the State Senate in special session found Thayer guilty of official misconduct by the unanimous vote of the 47 senators present.

The Legislature met for a special session at the State Capitol in Albany on July 10, 1934; and adjourned on August 18.

State Senate

Districts

Members
The asterisk (*) denotes members of the previous Legislature who continued in office as members of this Legislature.

Note: For brevity, the chairmanships omit the words "...the Committee on (the)..."

Employees
 Clerk: Marguerite O'Connell

State Assembly

Assemblymen

Note: For brevity, the chairmanships omit the words "...the Committee on (the)..."

Employees
 Clerk: Fred W. Hammond

Notes

Sources
 Members of the New York Senate (1930s) at Political Graveyard
 Members of the New York Assembly (1930s) at Political Graveyard
 McGinnies Gives Post To Friend of Macy in the Syracuse Journal, of Syracuse, on January 15, 1934

157
1934 in New York (state)
1934 U.S. legislative sessions